This is a list of royal consorts of rulers that held power over Persia (present-day Iran). The title Shahbanu was used for the female ruler or royal consort in certain dynasties, including the Sassanids and Pahlavis. The list is from the establishment of the Median Empire by Medes  until the deposition of the Pahlavi dynasty in 1979.

Median Dynasty (671–549 BC)

Teispid kingdom (705–559 BC)

Achaemenid Empire (559–334/327 BC)

Macedonian Empire (336–306 BC)

Seleucid Empire (311–129 BC)

Parthian Empire (247 BC – AD 228)

Sasanian Empire (224–651)

Umayyad Caliphate (661–750)

Abbasid Caliphate (750–861)

Buyid Kingdom (934–1062)

Seljuk Empire  (1029–1194)

Khwarazmian Empire (1153–1220)

Mongol Empire (1153–1220)

Ilkhanate (1256–1357)

Jalayirid Sultanate (1335–1432)

Timurid Empire (1370–1467)

Aq Quyunlu (1375–1497)

Safavid Empire (1501–1736)

Afsharid Empire (1736–1796)

Qajar Empire (1794–1925)

Pahlavi Empire (1925–1979)

See also

 List of monarchs of Persia
 List of ancient Persians
 Monarchism in Iran
 Iranian National Jewels

References

History of Iran
Iran history-related lists
Iranian empresses
Iranian women royalty
Lists of Iranian women
Persia
Lists of women by occupation
Persian queens consort